Blomstermåla is a locality situated in Mönsterås Municipality, Kalmar County, Sweden with 1,527 inhabitants in 2010.

References

External links

Populated places in Kalmar County
Populated places in Mönsterås Municipality